Langeais is a commune in the Indre-et-Loire department in central France. On 1 January 2017, the former commune of Les Essards was merged into Langeais.

Population

Sights
Langeais has a church of the 11th, 12th and 15th centuries, but is chiefly interesting for its large and historic château built soon after the middle of the 15th century by Jean Bourré, minister of Louis XI. Here the marriage of Charles VIII and Anne of Brittany took place in 1491. In the park, are the ruins of a keep of late 10th century architecture, built by Fulk Nerra (Black Hawk in old French), count of Anjou.

Transportation
Langeais is served by the A85 autoroute.

International relations
Langeais is twinned with:
 Eppstein, Germany
 Gondar, Portugal

Notes

References
Attribution

Communes of Indre-et-Loire
Touraine